Paramonovo is a village in Dmitrovsky District of Moscow Oblast, Russia, located  west of Moscow.  It is well known for its winter sports activities.

Sporting activities
Among its well-known activities are skiing and snowboarding. Construction occurred between February and December 2007 on a bobsleigh, luge, and skeleton track which would officially open on March 10, 2008.

References

FIL-Luge.org February 15, 2007 on the foundation being laid for the Moscow track.
September 15, 2007 Moscow Times article featuring Paramonmovo. - accessed May 26, 2008.
Skeletonsport.com December 28, 2007 story on the Moscow track opening up.
Track officially opened on March 10, 2008.

Rural localities in Moscow Oblast